The Crinn is an American mathcore band from St. Paul, Minnesota, United States, formed in 2005.  On April 20, 2010, they released their debut album Dreaming Saturn through Nuclear Blast records.

Discography
 Kills Curiosity (EP) (Self Released, 2006)
 Self Titled (EP) (Corrosive, 2007)
 Dreaming Saturn (Nuclear Blast, 2010)
 Shadowbreather (Self-released, 2015)

References

External links
**

Musical groups from Minnesota
Musical groups established in 2005
American mathcore musical groups
Nuclear Blast artists